Paralcyoniidae is a family of soft corals in the phylum Cnidaria.

Genera
The World Register of Marine Species includes the following genera in this family :
 Carotalcyon Utinomi, 1952
 Ceeceenus van Ofwegen & Benayahu, 2006
 Dimorphophyton Williams, 2000
 Maasella Poche, 1914
 Nanalcyon Imahara, 2013
 Paralcyonium Milne-Edwards & Haime, 1850
 Studeriotes Thomson & Simpson, 1909

References

 
Taxa named by John Edward Gray
Alcyoniina
Cnidarian families